is a Japanese visual novel series by Cocktail Soft (a part of F&C, later F&C FC02). Anime and manga have been based on the games.

The games are all set around restaurants in the fictional "Pia Carrot" chain, and most of the female characters are waitresses at these restaurants. The individual restaurants in the chain are called "1st", "2nd", etc. A maid café named "Pia Carrot" also opened in real life as a cosplay restaurant in Akihabara, Japan.

List of titles
Game titles

Animation titles
 Welcome to Pia Carrot!! (1997–1998; 3 episode hentai OVA)
 Welcome to Pia Carrot!! 2 (1998–1999; 3 episode hentai OVA)
 Welcome to Pia Carrot!! 2 DX (1999–2000; 6 episode OVA)
 Welcome to Pia Carrot!! -Sayaka no Koi-monogatari- (Sayaka's Love Story) (2002; movie)

Welcome to Pia Carrot
The first game in the series is called Welcome to Pia Carrot!! and was initially released in 1996 for MS-DOS on the NEC PC-9800 Series and for Windows 3.1. The game was later released for the PC-FX in 1997, and for the Sega Saturn in 1998 by KID.

There is also a hentai OVA with 3 episodes based on this title.

Characters
Yusuke Kinoshita
 (Welcome to the Pia Carrot!!!), Masami Kikuchi (Welcome to the Pia Carrot 2)
 Yusuke Kinoshita is the protagonist of the Welcome to Pia Carrot. In Welcome to the Pia Carrot 2, he is 2nd's chief, and 3rd's temporary chief in 2.2
Satomi Morihara

Shouko Inaba 

 Shouko Inaba is the childhood friend of Yusuke.
Reika Kokubo

Yukiko Kawai

Shiho Kannaduki

 1st's manager in this title
Yukari Tachibana

Saori Imai

Kiyomi Kitagawa

 Yusuke's cousin
Rumi Kinoshita

 Yusuke's younger sister
Yasuo Kinoshita
 Yusuke's father and owner of the Pia Carrot restaurant chain
Kaori Tachibana
 Yukari's mother
Saeko Imai
 Saori's stepmother
Airi Kashikura
 Additional character on Saturn version

Staff (Game)
 Scenario: Jane Inamura (Ryuichi Inamura)
 Original Picture: Tatsuki Amaduyu, CHARM, Nak-Mura (Takeshi Nakamura), Yukihiro Matsuo (additional character on Saturn version)
 Music: Tomohiro Takatsuka (except Saturn), Juri Goto (Saturn only)
 Opening for PC-FX Version: Ko Ku Ha Ku
 :Lyrics: Yukie Sugawara
 :Music: Yukie Sugawara
 Insert on Saturn Version: Miracle Sunshine
 :Lyrics: Juri Goto
 :Music: Juri Goto
 :Vocal: Megumi Miduki
 :Voice Actors:Izumi Mito as Satomi Morihara, Minami Nagasaki as Shoko Inaba, Hina Hatono as Reika Kokubo/Yukari Tachibana, Hotaru Natsuno as Yukiko Kawai, Kaori as Shiho Kannazuki, Satomi Kodama as Saori Imai, Mebu as Kiyomi Kitagawa, Akane Yoshino as Airi Kashikura

Welcome to Pia Carrot!! 2/2.2/2.5
Welcome to Pia Carrot 2 is the first true sequel to "Pia Carrot", set four years later than the first game. The original version (released in 1997) was for Windows 95 and was later released for Sega Saturn (1998 by NEC Interchannel), Windows 2000 (2001 by F&C FC02; this version also runs on Windows 95, 98, 98SE and Me) and the Dreamcast (2003 by NEC Interchannel). The Dreamcast release is the same as the first disc of the previously released "Pia Carrot 2.5". It is well known for its theme song "Go! Go! Waitress".

Two OVAs based on this title were released, the first being an adult title with 3 episodes, and the second ("Welcome to Pia Carrot 2 DX") was an all-age series with 6 episodes. "Welcome to Pia Carrot 2 DX" was licensed by Sentai Filmworks.

Welcome to Pia Carrot!! 2.2 is a branch of "Pia Carrot 2" and is set 4 months after that game. It was released for the Game Boy Color by NEC Interchannel in 2000. Welcome to Pia Carrot!! 2.5 is a combination set of "Pia Carrot 2" and "Pia Carrot 2.2" for the Dreamcast. This pack title contains 2 GD-ROMs.

Characters
Kouji Maeda
 (Welcome to the Pia Carrot 2), Akira Ishida (Welcome to the Pia Carrot 3)
 Protagonist of "Pia Carrot 2" and "Pia Carrot 2.2"
Azusa Hinomori

Mina Hinomori

 Azusa's younger sister
Tsukasa Enomoto
 Completely transferred to 2nd in 2.2
Ryoko Futaba

 2nd's manager. Substitute chief because Yuusuke has gone to 3rd in 2.2
Aoi Minase

 Ryoko's friend. 3rd's chief waitress in 2.2
Sanae Enishi

Mikiko Shinohara
 
Harue Yamana

Jun Kagurazaka

Kaoru Yamana
 Harue's daughter
Shinji Yano
 Kouji's friend and Ryoko's cousin
Tomomi Aizawa
 Additional character on the "consumer version" in 2 (Saturn and Dreamcast)
Yuki Kamizuka
 Additional character on the "consumer version" in 2
Noriko Shima
 Additional character on the "consumer version" in 2

Staff
2
 Scenario: Ryuichi Inamura
 Original Picture: Tatsuki Amaduyu, Misato Mitsumi, CHARM, Takashi Hashimoto (additional characters on consumer version)
 Music: DOORS MUSIC ENTERTAINMENT
 Opening: Go! Go! Waitress
 Ending (consumer version): Iced Tea
 :Lyrics: Hajime Kanasugi & Bun Yoshida
 :Music: Bun Yoshida
 :Vocal: Miyuki Kunitake

2.2
 Scenario: Hideki Shirane
 Character Design: Tatsuki Amaduyu, Misato Mitsumi, CHARM, Takashi Hashimoto
 Original Picture: Junji Goto
 Music: DOORS MUSIC ENTERTAINMENT

Welcome to Pia Carrot 3/3.3
Welcome to Pia Carrot!! 3 is the second true sequel to "Pia Carrot", set one year later than "Pia Carrot 2", and was released for the PC by F&C FC02 in 2001. Dreamcast and PlayStation 2 versions were released by NEC Interchannel in 2003.

In 2002, the anime movie "Welcome to Pia Carrot -Sayaka no Koi-monogatari-" ("Welcome to Pia Carrot - Sayaka's Love Story") was released, being the first movie based on an eroge.

Welcome to Pia Carrot 3.3 is a branch of "Pia Carrot 3" that is set one year after "Pia Carrot 3". It was released for the Game Boy Advance by NEC Interchannel in 2004.

Characters
3
Akihiko Kannazuki

 Protagonist of "Pia Carrot 3" and "Pia Carrot 3.3", and Shiho's younger brother
Sayaka Takai

Tomomi Aizawa

Akemi Hasegawa

 4th's temporary chief. 4th's chief in 3.3 (formally inaugurated after "Pia Carrot 3")
Natsuki Iwakura

 Akemi's friend and 4th's Manager
Miharu Fuyuki

Nana Kimishima

Takako Kinoshita

Orie Amano

Noboru Kinoshita
 Takako's nephew
Seiji Motoki
 
Haruhiko Fuyuki
 Miharu's younger brother
Shiho Kannazuki
 Akihiko's sister, and now 3rd's chief
Satomi Kinoshita
 1st's Manager. She is already married to Yusuke
Yuki Kamizuka
 
Noriko Shima
 
Kouji Maeda
 
Azusa Hinomori
 
3.3
Mina Hinomori
 
Tsukasa Enomoto
 
Chizuru Kinoshita
 
Shiori Kisaragi

Staff
3
 Scenario: Ryuichi Inamura
 Original Picture: Takashi Hashimoto, Hiroya Fujimiya, Elan Hasumi, Hiro Suzuhira
 Music: Kennichi Okuma (TWO-FIVE)
 Opening: Eien no story (The eternal story)
 :Lyrics: Don Mccow
 :Music: Kennichi Okuma
 :Vocal: Miu
 Ending: Koibito tachi no densetsu (The legend of lovers)
 :Lyrics: Don Mccow
 :Music: Kennichi Okuma
 :Vocal: Miu
 Ending (additional on consumer version): Happy-End kara hajimeyou
 :Lyrics: Don Mccow
 :Music: Kennichi Okuma
 :Vocal: Miu
3.3
 Scenario: Ryo Masaki
 Character Design: Takashi Hashimoto, Elan Hasumi, Hiro Suzuhira, Kanata Minamino
 Original Picture: Kanata Minamino, Elan Hasumi
 Music: Kennichi Okuma (TWO-FIVE), DOORS MUSIC ENTERTAINMENT

Welcome to Pia Carrot 4

Welcome to Pia Carrot 4 is the third true sequel to "Pia Carrot", and was released for the PC by Cocktail Soft in 2009. An Xbox 360 port was released on February 24, 2011 and a PlayStation Portable version was released in 2012.

Characters
 Alice Sakuraba
 Ayaka Kamine
 Misa Hasegawa 
 Sayuri Mashiba
 Sora Kitagawa
 Yoshimi Sakuraba
 Yuna Takigawa

Reception

In a 2007 survey of Dengeki G's Magazine readers, Welcome to Pia Carrot G.O. ranked 38th in a list of "the most interesting bishōjo games"; a five-way tie with YU-NO: A girl who chants love at the bound of this world, Tsukihime, Tokimeki Memorial 2, and Happiness!

References

External links

Games
Official F&C website

English Language Translation of Welcome to Pia Carrot (PC-FX)

Anime
Official Sentai website

1996 video games
1997 anime OVAs
1998 anime OVAs
1999 anime OVAs
2002 anime films
Bishōjo games
DOS games
Dreamcast games
Japan-exclusive video games
Eroge
Game Boy Advance games
Game Boy Color games
Hentai anime and manga
OVAs based on video games
PC-FX games
Pink Pineapple
PlayStation 2 games
Sega Saturn games
Sentai Filmworks
Video game franchises
Video games developed in Japan
Visual novels
Windows games